Emmerdale (known as Emmerdale Farm until 1989) is a British soap opera first broadcast on ITV on 16 October 1972. The soap was initially headed by executive producer Peter Holmans, who gave Emmerdale Farm a reputation for being a "sleepy soap" where not much happened. Holmans and other early executive producers focused on rural life and the events of the Sugden family, but in the late 1980s, Keith Richardson and a new team of producers became responsible for revamping the soap. Richardson and his team saw Emmerdale Farm move to a later transmission time, more dramatic storylines and a title change to Emmerdale, which resulted in the soap gaining viewers and becoming a major UK soap opera. In 2013, Kate Oates became the series producer of the soap and she expressed her aim to feature more of the countryside settings as seen in the earlier episodes, as well as add a balance to the soap's storylines rather than focus on a few dramatic storylines. Jane Hudson has been the executive producer of Emmerdale since 2018.

Executive producers

Series producers

Producers

References

Emmerdale
Emmerdale